Geoffrey Aori Mabea is an  energy economist and corporate executive and  the current Executive Secretaryof the Energy Regulators Association of East Africa. He assumed office in 2020  as the first Executive Secretary of the regional Organisation with the mandate of spearheading establishment of the East African Community Energy Union. Prior to joining EREA, he was a researcher at the University of Dundee. He also served as a capital projects advisor with PriceWaterHouseCoopers.

Education 
Mabea holds a bachelor's degree in Geomatics and a Master of Business Administration both obtained from Jomo Kenyatta University of Agriculture and Technology. He also has an Master of Science in energy economics and policy from the University of Surrey on a Chevening Scholarship. Later, he pursued a Doctor of Philosophy degree in Energy economics from the University of Dundee Scotland on a  Centre for Energy, Petroleum and Mineral Law and Policy Scholarship.

Career 
Mabea started his career as a port surveyor with the Kenya Ports Authority before switching his career into the Energy market. He worked in various senior positions with Kenya Electricity Generating Company in Kenya and Geothermal Development Company. He was appointed to the national committees for energy planning and Feed-in tariff  for Kenya between 2010 and 2012. While at Geothermal Development Company, he managed the delivery of over US$400million of Geothermal energy  projects at Menengai and Olkaria fields. He was later appointed to the capacity building cluster committee of the Northern Corridor Integration Projects as representative from Geothermal Development Company under the Ministry of Energy, Kenya. In 2014, he joined PriceWaterHouseCoopers first, as capital projects advisor for the East Market and later as a senior consultant.

In 2020, the General Assembly of Energy Regulators Association of East Africa, appointed him as its first Executive Secretary to work closely with the East African Community Secretariat and the national regulatory authorities to achieve the Energy Union. He is instrumental in establishing the East African Community  Energy Union and the realisation of the Africa Single Electricity Market and the Eastern Africa Power Pool. He has pioneered the development of the Energy Regulation Centre of Excellence(ERCE).

Other activities
Mabea sits on the Advisory board of Nalule Energy and Mineral Consultants . He also sits at the governing board of the Energy Regulation Centre of Excellence(ERCE). He is also a member of the International Association for Energy Economics. His  main areas of interest are energy policy harmonisation, energy markets integration, economic welfare, economic governance and sustainable capacity building.

References

External links
Brief Bio
Website of the Energy Regulators of East Africa
Website of the Energy Regulation Centre of Excellence

Alumni of the University of Dundee
Alumni of the University of Surrey
Jomo Kenyatta University of Agriculture and Technology alumni
Kenyan diplomats
Year of birth missing (living people)
Living people
21st-century Kenyan economists